Sheikh Tarik bin Faisal Al Qasimi is a member of the Al Qasimi family of Sharjah, United Arab Emirates; businessman and Jiu-Jitsu champion. He served as a member of the Executive Council of the Government of Sharjah and led the economic committee from 1997 to 2007. He is the Chairman of ENSHAA PSC, Chairman of Emirates Investments Group and serves as the Chairman of Arab Union for Entrepreneurship.

Early life
Tarik earned a bachelor's degree in business administration from Higher Colleges of Technology, Dubai and master's degree in International Finance from Westminster University.

Career 
After completing his education, Tarik returned to Sharjah. He served as chairman for the General Authority of Sharjah Free Zones in 1997. He served at the Sharjah Economic Development (SEDD) and the Sharjah Commerce and Tourism Development Authority (SCTDA). He was involved in the creation and growth of enterprises to develop and manage projects in hospitality and real estate through six operating units: Enshaa, Faya Investments and others. He developed Palazzo Versace Dubai, a luxury five-star hotel in Dubai.

Jiu-Jitsu
Tarik is a professional martial artist and won the multiple titles:

Bronze medal in the blue belt division European Jiu-Jitsu Championship held in Lisbon Portugal in 2011.
Gold medal European
Silver medal worlds No Gi 2014 in Los Angeles US International Jiu-Jitsu Championship
Silver medal worlds No Gi 2015
Gold medal Abu Dhabi Grand Slam in London 2016

References 

Tarik bin Faisal Al Qassemi
Living people
Year of birth missing (living people)
Emirati businesspeople